Warkon is a rural locality in the Maranoa Region, Queensland, Australia.

Geography 
The Balonne River (a continuation of the Condamine River) forms the southern boundary of the locality and a number of creek flow through the locality into the river. The Roma Condamine Road passes from east to west through the locality connecting from Condamine to the east to the Carnarvon Highway to the west.

Bingi Crossing (also written as Bingie Crossing) is the ford on the Balonnne River near the current River Road which connects Warkon with neighbouring Noorindoo.

The land use is predominantly cattle grazing and there are a number of areas of state forests: Yuleba State Forest, Wallabella State Forest 1, and Tinowon State Forest.

History 
The locality name derives from a pastoral run name used from 1850 and is an Aboriginal word group (possibly from the Mandandanji language) meaning plenty of water.

Warkon Station was established on the Balonne River in 1850 by Henry Bingham, one of the early settlers in the Maranoa district. From 1858 to 1872 the property was operated by Alexander and Harriet Barlow. Warkon Station had Aboriginal workers from a number of different language groups. Harriet Barlow was one of the first people to record the Aboriginal languages of this region, which she called Coongarri, Wirri-Wirri, Ngoorie, Yowaleri, Cooinburri, Begumble, Cambooble and Parrungoom. She published her work in a number of journals. The Warkon Station was subsequently owned by Leonard Reynolds Schwennesen who added further notes to Barlow's material. The State Library of Queensland hold a collection of the manuscripts of Barlow and Schwennesen.

Retreat Provisional School opened circa 1896. It operated from at least 1899 to 1905 as a half-time school in conjunction with Nellybri Provisional School (meaning the two schools shared a single teacher). In 1906 Retreat Provisional School became a full-time school but closed later that year. Retreat is a pastoral property in Warkon.

St Paul's Anglican Church opened at Bingie Crossing circa June 1914. It was served by the Bush Brotherhood. Its last service was 20 December 1942.

Yuleba Creek State School opened on 23 January 1967 and closed on 31 December 1999. It was on Roma Condamine Road with Yuleba Creek flowing beside the school.

References

Further reading

External links 

Maranoa Region
Localities in Queensland